C'mon is short for "come on". 

C'mon may also refer to:

Music

Songs 
"C'Mon" (Kesha song), 2012
"C'Mon" (Mario song), 2003
"C'Mon" (The Screaming Jets song), 1990
"C'mon"/"Jo-Anna Says", a 2005 single by Per Ges
"C'mon", a 2010 song by Tiësto and Diplo
"C'mon (Catch 'em by Surprise)", a remade of the song with additional vocals by Busta Rhymes, 2011
"C'mon", a song on Guster's 2006 Ganging Up on the Sun
"C'mon", a song on Devo's 1984 album Shout
"C'mon", a song by Junior Senior from their 2003 album D-D-Don't Don't Stop the Beat
"C'mon", a 2011 split single by Panic! at the Disco and fun.
"C'mon", a song on the Rustic Overtones album ¡Viva Nueva! and Elmin Karisik

Albums 
C'mon (Low album)
C'mon (B'z album)
C'mon! (Keith Anderson album)

Bands 
C'mon (band), a Canadian rock band, formed in 2003

Other uses
C'MON, 1960s New Zealand television series featuring Suzanne Lynch
CMON Limited, a Singaporean company
Golisano Children's Museum of Naples, known as C'mon

See also
Come On (disambiguation)
C'mon C'mon (disambiguation)